Otto Gregussen (born 15 September 1956) is a Norwegian politician for the Labour Party. He was political advisor to the Minister of Fisheries 1992–1994, state secretary to the Minister of Fisheries 1994–1996, and Minister of Fisheries 2000–2001 in the first cabinet Stoltenberg.

References

1956 births
Living people
Government ministers of Norway
Politicians from Bodø